Loy Hering (b. 1484–85 in Kaufbeuren, d. 1 June 1564 in Eichstätt) was a German Renaissance sculptor.

He began his career as an apprentice to Hans Beierlein in Augsburg. Between 1511 and 1512 he settled in Eichstätt, where in 1519 he was elected to the city council, from which he was elected to the post of Mayor several times (1523–24, 1527, 1533 and 1540). His greatest patron was the Prince-Bishop Gabriel von Eyb. With his sons and apprentices Hering ran one of the most prolific artist's workshops of the German renaissance, supplying sculptures to almost the entire German speaking region.

References
This article is a translation of the equivalent article on the German Wikipedia as of 22 February 2009

 Jeffrey Chipps Smith. "Hering, Loy." In Grove Art Online. Oxford Art Online, (accessed February 3, 2012; subscription required).
 Felix Mader: Loy Hering: Ein Beitrag zur Geschichte der deutschen Plastik des XVI. Jahrhunderts. Munich, 1905 
 Peter Reindl: Loy Hering: Zur Rezeption der Renaissance in Süddeutschland. Basel, 1977

External links 
 
 Entry for Loy Hering on the Union List of Artist Names

German sculptors
German male sculptors
1480s births
1564 deaths
People from Kaufbeuren
Renaissance sculptors